The 2010 Detroit Windsor International Film Festival was the 3rd annual film festival held in Detroit, Michigan, United States & Windsor, Ontario, Canada. It ran from June 24, 2010 to June 27, 2010. The lineup consisted of 80 films shown as part of the DWIFF proper and many others as a part of MovingMedia. The selection included 32 shorts and 10 feature films. The festival was attended by members of the industry, press and general public. It opened with the world premiere of Eddie and the Alternate Universe, a film about a 10-year-old boy who is sent to an alternate reality by an eccentric neighborhood wizard and must fight to return to his world, and closed  with the films submitted as part of the DWIFF Challenge.

2010 Award Winners

Best Feature 
"Bilal's Stand" - Sultan Sharrief

Best Detroit Windsor Feature 
"Annabelle and Bear" - Amy S Weber

Best Documentary 
"Grown in Detroit" - Mascha & Manfred Poppenk

Best Detroit Windsor Documentary 
"Regional Roots" - Carrie LeZotte

Best International Film 
"Grown in Detroit" - Mascha & Manfred Poppenk

Best Detroit Windsor Children's Film 
"Eddie and The Alternate Universe" - Samuel Lemberg

Best International Children's Film 
"The Nickel" - Bill Reilly

Best Comedic Short 
"Air Knob"  Nathan Fleet

Best Short 
"Qing Lou Nu" - Bryan Hopkins

Best Detroit Windsor Short 
"Bare Witness" - Jeffery T. Schultz

DWIFF Chalange

First Place 
Scallywag Entertainment, "The Fall of a Sparrow"

Second Place 
Gillissie, "Fracture"

Third Place 
Wing It, "You"

Honorable Mention 
Group Therapy, "Walk Off"

Audience Choice 
A&W Movies, "The Bitch is Back"

Films Shown at the DWIFF

Animation
H2oil - Animated Segments

Commercials
NEC 'Make it happen'

Children's
 Chasing Mascots
 Eddie and the Alternate Universe
 Murphy's Short's
 The Nickel

Documentary
 Grown in Detroit
 H2oil - Animated Segments
 No Good Reason
 Regional Roots
 Resilience: Stories of Single Black Mothers
 The Mountain Music Project
 Tresor Berlin

Shorts
 'Bare Witness'
 Across the Street
 Air Knob
 Arithmetic Lesson
 Boxed In
 Broken Fidelity
 Chickenfut
 Coping
 Council
 Deal Breaker
 Debt of the Heart
 Did You ... 
 Double Talk
 Elusive Man
 Fantastic Glass Portrait
 Forbidden Fruit
 Free Lunch
 H2oil - Animated Segments
 Horst
 La Moustache
 Memoirs of a Blogger
 Osama Bin Latte
 Pink Slip
 Qing Lou Nu
 Relax Dude
 Sapsucker
 Televisnu
 Thank You, Mr. Patterson
 The Lost Food Shop
 The Window
 Thief
 too soon too late

Features
 Annabelle & Bear
 Bilal's Stand
 Blind Sided
 From A Place of Darkness
 I am Bish
 Ice Grill, USA
 Pizza With Bullets
 Starlight & Superfish
 The Art of Power
 The Crimson Mask

DWIFF Challenge

Teams Accepted for Judging and All Awards
These films met the following criteria; received on time, film could be played back / watched, all elements were present and accurate in submitted film, film was within the run-time limit, and there were not any obscene or pornographic scenes in the film.  Films listed in order of team number assignment.

 5, A&W Movies
 9, T 130
 11, Group Therapy
 16, Wing it
 17, Reel Temptations
 18, Top Hat
 19, Woodbridge
 21, Reel Hood
 22, A.G.e Industries
 23, Gillissie
 24, Scallywag
 25, Motor City
 28 LB Entertainment

Teams Accepted for Screening and Audience Choice Award
These films met the following criteria; received on time, film could be played  back / watched, and there were not any obscene or pornographic scenes in the film.  Films listed in order of team number assignment.

 2, Krist10 Cartoons
 14, Neon Complex
 37, Independent

Teams Accepted for Screening
These films met the following criteria; film could be played  back / watched, and there were not any obscene or pornographic scenes in the film.

 A-Team
 Team Channel 19
 Evolution Entertainment
 Afternoon Productions
 HFCC Film Club
 Troll Vision
 JML Productions
 Danse Paratus
 Phoenix Gilly Productions

See also

 Detroit Windsor International Film Festival
 Ann Arbor Film Festival
 Toronto International Film Festival
 Windsor–Detroit International Freedom Festival
 Detroit–Windsor

References

External links
 
 The DWIFF Chalange
 MovingMedia Student Film Festival
 DWIFF Tech Fair

Detroit Windsor International Film Festival
Detroit Windsor International Film Festival
Detroit Windsor International Film Festival
Detroit Windsor International Film Festival 03
Detroit Windsor International Film Festival
Detroit Windsor International Film Festival